All My Heart is the second international release by Japanese singer/songwriter Mari Hamada, released on August 4, 1994 in Asia by MCA Records. The album includes a duet version of "Fixing a Broken Heart" with Indecent Obsession. Some of the English songs are reworked versions of Hamada's hit singles from previous Japanese releases; in addition; some tracks were previously included in the European release of the 1993 album Introducing... Mari Hamada.

In Japan, selected songs from this album were released in Hamada's 2003 compilation Inclination II.

Track listing

Tracks 9–11 in Japanese.
Tracks 1, 2, 6, 8 previously featured in the European release of Introducing... Mari Hamada.
Track 11 originally from the 1991 album Tomorrow.

Personnel 
 Takashi Masuzaki – guitar
 Michael Landau – guitar
 Masatoshi Nishimura – bass
 Leland Sklar – bass
 John Pierce – bass
 Kazuhiro Hara – keyboards
 Randy Kerber – keyboards
 Tom Keane – keyboards
 Munetaka Higuchi – drums
 John Keane – drums
 Mike Baird – drums
 Efraine Toro – percussion
 Donna Delory – backing vocals
 Indecent Obsession
 Richard Hennassey – lead vocals
 Graham Kearns – guitar
 Michael Szumowski – keyboards
 Mark Gray – bass
 Daryl Sims – drums

References

External links 
 
 
 

1994 compilation albums
Mari Hamada compilation albums
MCA Records compilation albums
English-language Japanese albums